The 1969 Tour de Romandie was the 23rd edition of the Tour de Romandie cycle race and was held from 7 May to 11 May 1969. The race started in Geneva and finished in Porrentruy. The race was won by Felice Gimondi.

General classification

References

1969
Tour de Romandie
May 1969 sports events in Europe